Christian Benjamin Fox (born 11 April 1981) is a Scottish football manager, most recently for Selby Town, and former professional footballer who played as a midfielder for York City, Larne, Selby Town, Pickering Town and Wakefield.

He was also called up for a 3 day England Under 18 squad training session in July 1999.

References

External links

1981 births
Living people
Footballers from Aberdeenshire
Scottish footballers
Association football midfielders
York City F.C. players
Larne F.C. players
Harrogate Town A.F.C. players
English Football League players